The 1933 Grand National was the 92nd renewal of the Grand National horse race that took place at Aintree Racecourse near Liverpool, England, on 24 March 1933.

The steeplechase was won by Kellsboro' Jack, a 25/1 shot ridden by jockey Dudley Williams. The seven-year-old horse was trained by Ivor Anthony for American owner F. Ambrose Clark. Anthony later trained another National winner, Royal Mail, in 1937.

Really True came in second, Slater came in third, and Delaneige came in fourth. Thirty-four horses ran and all returned safely to the stables.

Finishing order

Non-finishers

References

 1933
Grand National
Grand National
20th century in Lancashire
March 1933 sports events